The 1983–84 Irish Cup was the 104th edition of Northern Ireland's premier football knock-out cup competition. It began on 28 January 1984, and concluded on 5 May 1984 with the final.

Glentoran were the defending champions after winning their 10th Irish Cup last season, defeating rivals Linfield 2–1 in the 1983 final replay. This season they reached the semi-finals, but lost to Carrick Rangers. Ballymena United won their fourth Irish Cup (fifth if you include Ballymena's record), defeating Carrick Rangers 4–1 in the final.

Results

First round

|}

Replays

|}

Second round

|}

Replays

|}

Second replay

|}

Quarter-finals

|}

Semi-finals

|}

Final

References

1983–84
1983–84 domestic association football cups
Cup